Baruch El Elyon is a piyyut attributed to Baruch ben Samuel of Mainz ( – 1221). The poem is acrostically signed "BaRUCH HaZaQ". Among Ashkenazic communities, it is a traditional zemer for Shabbat lunch. Though one manuscript lists it at the end of the order for the Sabbath, Israel Isserlein (1390-1460) already sang it on Sabbath morning.

The poem's theme is singing praises to God, who gave complete physical and mental rest to his people. The payytan describes the joy of Shabbat and its dignity, which is glorified with delicious food and festive clothes, the enormous reward that the keeper of the Sabbath will receive both now and in heaven, the powerful human experience of the Sabbath, the feelings it evokes, and the importance of Shabbat to God.

According to the piyyut, the Sabbath breaks the natural routine of the weekdays and in the process elevates the Jew to another level. The piyyut also  recalls that God will redeem his people because of the Sabbath: "Yohanan said that Shimon ben Yochai said, 'If Israel kept two Shabbats appropriately, we would immediately be redeemed'".

Text 
The piyyut contains seven verses, each four lines with 12 syllables per line. The first and last verses rhyme on an ABABABAB pattern, while the middle five verses follow an ABABABCD pattern, where C rhymes with A (4x) or B (1x)  and D rhymes with the first verse. One 13th-century manuscript of Machzor Vitry contains verses 1, 2, and 4, spelling ברך. One 14th-century fragment includes verses 6-7. Another manuscript of Machzor Vitry contains all seven verses. MS Schocken 22, a machzor for the Jews of Corfu, also includes the piyyut.

Hagadol version 
An early alternative version of the last verse is found in NLI Ms. Heb. 8°844, a 15th-century Sephardic siddur, where it is marked as a "pizmon for Shabbat Hagadol". The piyyut mentions the commandment to eat matza and the Exodus.

References

Sabbath
Jewish music
Jewish liturgical poems
Zemirot